Klaus Hänel (23 February 1936 – 15 June 2016) was a German footballer who played as a winger or midfielder for Werder Bremen. With Werder Bremen he won the Bundesliga in the 1964–65 season. He made his last Bundesliga appearance on 13 January 1968 against Eintracht Frankfurt.

Honours
Werder Bremen
 Bundesliga: 1964–65
 DFB-Pokal: 1960–61

References

External links
 

1936 births
2016 deaths
German footballers
Association football wingers
Germany youth international footballers
Bundesliga players
SV Werder Bremen players
SV Werder Bremen II players
German football managers